Wang Lisi (born 28 November 1991) is a Chinese footballer who currently plays for Jiangsu Huatai in the Chinese Women's Super League.

International goals

References

External links 
 
 

1991 births
Living people
Chinese women's footballers
China women's international footballers
2015 FIFA Women's World Cup players
Women's association football midfielders
Sportspeople from Nanjing
Footballers at the 2014 Asian Games
Asian Games competitors for China